The following is a list of politics by U.S. state and U.S. territory. The District of Columbia is also included.